The Charlotte Medal is a silver medallion,  in diameter, depicting the voyage of the convict transport Charlotte, with the First Fleet, to Sydney, New South Wales, Australia. Its obverse depicts the ship and the reverse is inscribed with a description of the journey. Struck by convict Thomas Barrett upon arriving in Botany Bay aboard Charlotte in January 1788, the medal is said to be the first work of Australian colonial art. Within a month, Barrett became the first person to be executed in the new colony.

Creation
During the journey the Charlotte visited Rio de Janeiro. Whilst at anchor, one of the ship's convicts, a forger and mutineer by the name of Thomas Barrett was caught giving locals fake coins made from buckles, buttons and spoons. The Surgeon-general of the Fleet, John White was impressed with his skill in making these forgeries, without having the apparent means to do so. This led him to commission Barrett to make the medal, to commemorate the journey, possibly from the surgeon's silver kidney dish.

Inscriptions
The obverse of the medal depicts the Charlotte at anchor at night in Botany Bay. The inscription reads 

The reverse of the medal is inscribed with a journal of the voyage. It reads

Owners and ANMM purchase
It is unknown who owned the medal after White. It is possible that he presented it with his voyage findings, or it stayed with his family after his death, but at some point before 1919 it came into the possession of Princess Victoria and Prince Louis.

In 1919 it was sold via Sotheby, Wilkinson & Hodge to a British numismatist, Henry Baldwin.

In 1967 it was sold to an American numismatist, John J Ford.

In 1981 it was sold to a Melbourne dentist, Dr John Chapman, for $15,000 at Spink Sydney Auction. Dr Chapman donated a medal containing a reproduction of the Charlotte Medal to Museum Victoria to mark its bicentennial, in 1988.

In 2008 the Australian National Maritime Museum, with funds from the National Cultural Heritage Account, authorised through the Australian Government, won an auction for the medal with a bid of $750,000. The final price was $873,750, with $200,000 of NCH funding.

This makes it possible that, despite its age, the medal has only been sold four times.

Copper medal
The medal was made for White's personal servant, William Broughton and omits the ship scene, being inscribed simply with an abridged version of the journey. The medallion was uncovered during house restoration in the early 1940s. It has been suggested that this medal should "rank as equal in rarity and significance" as its silver counterpart.

References

External links
 The Charlotte Medal at the Australian National Maritime Museum 

Australian art
Decorative arts
Maritime culture
Numismatics